The Wembley International Tournament, known as the Makita International Tournament for sponsorship reasons from 1989, was an association football pre-season friendly tournament held annually in England between 1988 and 1994.

Originally organised by IEP Tournaments, it was first staged in August 1988, with Arsenal beating A.C. Milan in the final. All the matches were held at Wembley Stadium. Typically, it hosted a combination of English and Continental teams, and was held at Wembley until 1991. Thereafter it was held at different venues around the country until the final competition in 1994. It was televised in all years by ITV.

Winners
Arsenal and Sampdoria were the record winners of the trophy, each winning three times. The only other team to win it was Chelsea.

See also
Umbro International Tournament

References

External links
IEP Tournaments homepage

Defunct international club association football competitions in Europe
English football friendly trophies
International club association football competitions hosted by London
1988 establishments in England
1994 disestablishments in England
Events at Wembley Stadium